Tomas Bulik (born August 27, 1985) is a Slovak professional ice hockey centre. He is currently a free agent having last played for HK Dukla Trenčín of the Slovak Extraliga. He participated at the 2010 IIHF World Championship as a member of the Slovakia men's national ice hockey team.

Career statistics

References

External links

1985 births
Living people
HC '05 Banská Bystrica players
HC Bílí Tygři Liberec players
HC Karlovy Vary players
HC Košice players
HC Prešov players
HC Slovan Bratislava players
HC Yugra players
HK Dukla Trenčín players
MHC Martin players
MHk 32 Liptovský Mikuláš players
MsHK Žilina players
Slovak expatriate ice hockey players in Russia
Slovak ice hockey centres
Sportspeople from Prešov
Stadion Hradec Králové players
Slovak expatriate ice hockey players in the Czech Republic